This page serves as a central navigational point for lists of more than 2,350 members of the University of Oxford, divided into relevant groupings for ease of use. The vast majority were students at the university, although they did not necessarily take a degree; others have held fellowships at one of the university's colleges; many fall into both categories. This page does not include people whose only connection with the university consists in the award of an honorary degree or an honorary fellowship.

The list has been divided into categories indicating the field of activity in which people have become well known. Many of the university's alumni/ae, or old members, as they are more traditionally known, have attained a level of distinction in more than one field. These appear only in the category with which it is felt they are most often associated, or in which they have been more recently involved. Hence Jeffrey Archer (Brasenose), a novelist, is listed as a life peer; Imran Khan (Keble), a former captain of the Pakistani cricket team, is listed as a Pakistani politician. Some academic disciplines are more difficult to define than others. In particular, many theologians, lawyers, and sociologists work in areas that might be thought to be encompassed by philosophy.

Oxonians (a term for members, students or alumni of the university derived from its Latin name, Academia Oxoniensis) have included two British kings and at least twelve monarchs of ten other sovereign states, twenty-eight British prime ministers, and thirty-five presidents and prime ministers of nineteen other countries.  there are seven Oxonians in the Cabinet of the United Kingdom and two in the Shadow Cabinet. The university lays claim to twelve saints, ten blesseds, an antipope, eighteen cardinals, and eighty-nine archbishops (including thirty-two of Canterbury and twenty-two of York). The university claims forty-seven Nobel Laureates and three Fields Medallists. The university's oldest student was Gertrud Seidmann, who was awarded a Certificate of Graduate Attainment aged 91.

This list also includes twenty-five princes and princesses (among them the heirs apparent of Belgium, Brunei, and Japan), thirty-four dukes, nineteen marquesses, eighty-two earls and countesses, forty-six viscounts and viscountesses, and 188 barons and baronesses; 246 bishops (Anglican and Catholic); 291 Members of Parliament (excluding MPs who were subsequently peers), eleven Members of the European Parliament (excluding MEPs also serving at Westminster), twelve Lord Chancellors, nine Lord Chief Justices and twenty-two law lords; ten US Senators, ten US Representatives (including a Speaker of the House), three state governors, and four associate justices of the US Supreme Court; as well as six puisne justices of the Supreme Court of Canada and a chief justice of the now defunct Federal Court of Canada.

Government

Monarchs

British

Foreign

Royalty

British

Foreign

Heads of state and heads of government

British Prime Ministers

Other countries

His Majesty's Government

Shadow Cabinet

House of Lords and House of Commons

Members of the European Parliament

British local politicians

British civil servants

British diplomats

Members of the British Royal Household

British military, security, and police personnel

Foreign politicians, civil servants, diplomats, and military personnel

Non-government people in British public life

Non-government people in public life overseas

Law

Lord Chancellors and Lord Chief Justices

Lords of Appeal in Ordinary (Law Lords)

Other judges and lawyers: United Kingdom

Judges and lawyers: other countries

Legal academics

Religions

Christianity

Saints

Blessed

Pope

Cardinals

Archbishops of Canterbury

Archbishops of York

Other Archbishops, Presiding Bishops, and Metropolitans

Other Bishops

Clergy and other ministers

Theologians

Islam

Judaism

Bahá'í

Buddhism

Study of Religions

Literature

Poets
Poets Laureate

Novelists and story writers

Dramatists

Children's writers

Scholars, critics, diarists, publishers, librarians

Travel and non-fiction writers
 Katharine Lee Bates

Media

Many journalists work in both print and broadcast media. The following are listed under the medium for which they are best known. Those who are known solely as sports commentators will be found at List of University of Oxford people in sport, exploration, and adventuring.

Print

Editors

Writers

Broadcast

Administration

The arts

Stage and television

Comedy

Film

Dance
Baisali Mohanty (Wolfson)

Music
Composers

Conductors

Organists

Pianists

Singers

Musicologists

Administration
Tony Hall, Baron Hall of Birkenhead (Keble) Chief Executive Royal Opera House 2001–
Nicholas Kenyon (Balliol) Contr Radio 3 1992–, Dir Proms 1996–2000, Contr Proms, Live Events & TV Classical Music 2000–
Anthony Russell-Roberts (New College) Administrative Director of the Royal Ballet 1983–

Didgeridoo
Graham Wiggins

Jazz
Bill Ashton
Pat Fish (Patrick Huntrods) (Merton)
Soweto Kinch (Hertford)

Country
Kris Kristofferson (Merton)

Folk
June Tabor (St Hugh's)

Rock and pop
Mira Aroyo (attended but did not graduate)
Edwin Congreave
Guthrie Govan (attended but did not graduate)
Myles MacInnes (Mylo) (Brasenose)
Yannis Philippakis (St John's)
Mike Ratledge (University)
Mr Hudson

Museum and gallery directors

Art and history of art

Architecture

Thomas Graham Jackson (Wadham)
Edward James (Christ Church)
John Martin Robinson
Sacheverell Sitwell (Balliol)
Christopher Wren (Wadham and All Souls)
Jack Diamond

Academic disciplines

This includes:

Educationalists

Sports people, explorers and adventurers

Business people

Chefs and wine experts
*
Oz Clarke (Pembroke)
Hugh Fearnley-Whittingstall (St Peter's)
Nigella Lawson (Lady Margaret Hall)
Jancis Robinson (St Anne's)
Rick Stein (New College)

Fictional Oxonians

See also

List of Rhodes Scholars
List of Vice-Chancellors of the University of Oxford
List of Current Heads of Oxford University Colleges, Societies, and Halls

External links
British Society for the History of Mathematics: Oxford individuals
Famous Oxford Alumni
Short Alumni List Published by Oxford

References

Oxford